Julien Benneteau and Édouard Roger-Vasselin were the defending champions, but Benneteau decided not to participate this year.

Roger-Vasselin played alongside Nicolas Mahut and successfully defended his title, defeating Ken and Neal Skupski in the final, 6–1, 7–5.

Seeds

Draw

References
 Main Draw

Doubles